United Nations Security Council resolution 519, adopted on 17 August 1982, after recalling previous resolutions on the topic and studying the report by the secretary-general on the United Nations Interim Force in Lebanon (UNIFIL), the council noted the situation between Israel and Lebanon warranted an extension of UNIFIL, until 19 October 1982.

The council then authorised UNIFIL to carry out humanitarian tasks in addition to its usual mandate, and supported the secretary-general and observers from the United Nations Truce Supervision Organization in their roles.

The resolution was adopted by 13 votes to none, while the People's Republic of Poland and Soviet Union abstained from voting.

See also
 1982 Lebanon War
 Blue Line
 Israeli–Lebanese conflict
 List of United Nations Security Council Resolutions 501 to 600 (1982–1987)

References
Text of the Resolution at undocs.org

External links
 

 0519
Israeli–Lebanese conflict
 0519
Middle East peace efforts
 0519
August 1982 events